George Crane may refer to:

 George Levi Crane (1891–1952), American-born doctor and political figure in Saskatchewan
 George W. Crane (1901–1995), psychologist, physician and syndicated newspaper columnist